Colorado's 12th Senate district is one of 35 districts in the Colorado Senate. It has been represented by Republican Bob Gardner since 2017, succeeding fellow Republican Bill Cadman.

Geography
District 12 is based in southern Colorado Springs in El Paso County, also covering the nearby communities of Cimarron Hills, Fort Carson, and parts of Security-Widefield, Falcon, and Stratmoor. 

The district is located entirely within Colorado's 5th congressional district, and overlaps with the 15th, 16th, 17th, 18th, 19th, 20th, and 21st districts of the Colorado House of Representatives.

Recent election results
Colorado Senators are elected to staggered four-year terms; under normal circumstances, the 12th district holds elections in presidential years.

2020

2016

2012

Federal and statewide results in District 12

References 

12
El Paso County, Colorado